Joerg Schiedek is a paralympic athlete from Germany competing mainly in category F46 javelin events.

Biography
Joerg Schiedek has competed in the javelin at three Paralympics, winning the gold medal in 1996 and the bronze medal in 2000 he also competed in the 4 × 100 m relay and long jump at the 1992 Summer Paralympics and the 4 × 400 m relay at the 2000 games.

References

Paralympic athletes of Germany
Athletes (track and field) at the 1992 Summer Paralympics
Athletes (track and field) at the 1996 Summer Paralympics
Athletes (track and field) at the 2000 Summer Paralympics
Paralympic gold medalists for Germany
Paralympic bronze medalists for Germany
Living people
Medalists at the 1996 Summer Paralympics
Medalists at the 2000 Summer Paralympics
Year of birth missing (living people)
Paralympic medalists in athletics (track and field)
German male javelin throwers
Javelin throwers with limb difference
Paralympic javelin throwers